Nagayama may refer to:

People
Nagayama Eita (born 1982), Japanese actor from Tokyo
Kazuya Nagayama (born 1982), Japanese football player
Kozo Nagayama (born 1956), Japanese television and film director
Kunio Nagayama (born 1970), former Japanese football player
Norio Nagayama (1949–1997), Japanese spree killer and novelist
Osamu Nagayama (born 1947), Japanese CEO of Chugai Pharmaceutical and Chairman of Sony Corporation
Takashi Nagayama (born 1978), Japanese actor
, Japanese government minister
Yōko Nagayama (born 1968), Japanese enka singer, former J-pop singer, and actress

Stations
Kita-Nagayama Station
Minami-Nagayama Station
Nagayama Station (Aichi)
Nagayama Station (Hokkaido)
Nagayama Station (Tokyo)

Geography
Mount Nagayama

Japanese-language surnames